

Ža 
Žaovine (Jajce), Žabljak (Livno)

Žd 
Ždralovići (Bugojno), Ždrimci (Uskoplje)

Že 
Željuša (Mostar), Žepče, Žeželovo (Kiseljak)

Ži 
Žigovi Goražde,  Žilići Goražde, Žirović Livno, Žitomislići (Mostar), Žitovo Goražde, Živčići (Fojnica), Živinice Tuzla Canton, Živojevići Goražde

Žu 
Žuglići Jablanica, Žukovica (Neum), Župa Drvar, Župica Drvar, Žuželo

Lists of settlements in the Federation of Bosnia and Herzegovina (A-Ž)